Magneto, a character appearing in American comic books published by Marvel Comics, has been included in almost every media adaptation of the X-Men franchise, including films, television series and video games.

Television

Magneto appeared in several Marvel animated series from 1967 to 1991.

Spider-Man (1967 TV series)
In the 1967 Spider-Man animated series, Spider-Man battled a scientist named Dr. Matto Magneto wielding a magnetic gun in "The Revenge of Dr. Magneto". The character was (very) loosely based on the Magneto character from the comics, and more closely resembled Albert Einstein instead of Erik Magnus Lehnsherr. This character is also not a mutant nor had any super powers. His name is pronounced "Mag-netto" instead of "Mag-neet-o" because he is German.

Fantastic Four (1978 TV series)
In the 1978 Fantastic Four animated series, Magneto (voiced by John Stephenson) briefly took control of the team in "The Menace Of Magneto". Here, he is not depicted as a mutant. Instead he is simply an extremely powerful supervillain with typical aspirations such as robbing a bank. Instead of flying, he moves around in a bizarre, car-like device which he moves using his magnetic powers. He was defeated when Reed Richards tricked him with a wooden gun.

1980s

Spider-Man (1981 TV series)
The solo Spider-Man animated series from 1981 featured Magneto in the episode "When Magneto Speaks... People Listen". In this version he used the alias Mr. M, took over and hid several of the world's communication satellites and demanded $100 million in gold to return power to the world. He was defeated by Spider-Man who was able to turn his magnet power back at him using a microwave relay but Magneto managed to escape.

Spider-Man and His Amazing Friends
Magneto returned in Spider-Man and His Amazing Friends, attempting to free his fellow mutants from prison in "The Prison Plot". He was voiced by Michael Rye. The character also made a cameo appearance in flashback in "A Firestar Is Born", as Firestar recounts her past to the X-Men. In spite of his Spider-Man television appearances, he has appeared in only two issues of a Spider-Man title.

Pryde of the X-Men
Magneto was the main villain in the animated X-Men pilot X-Men: Pryde of the X-Men - his first actual animated appearance battling the X-Men. He was voiced by Earl Boen.

X-Men (TV series)

Magneto's voice was provided by David Hemblen in the series X-Men, where he played a prominent role. Curiously, though he began on the show as a villain, his character spent more time as an ally to the X-Men, fighting alongside them against common enemies such as the Sentinels and Mr. Sinister as opposed to the cold-hearted villain he was previously portrayed as in earlier shows like Pryde of the X-Men.

In the series, he briefly appears in the first episode "Night of the Sentinels: Part I" on a television screen Jubilee accidentally turns on with her powers but Magneto makes his true first appearance in the third episode "Enter Magneto", where he attempts to incite a war between humans and mutants by attacking a military base and launching its nuclear armaments, though they are prevented from reaching their targets by the X-Men. It is revealed that his real name is Magnus, and he is an old friend of Xavier's. However, a violent encounter with an army convinces Magnus that humans and mutants can't coexist, and the two parted ways.

He reappears in the next episode "Deadly Reunions", when he attacks a chemical plant in an effort to draw Xavier out to face him. After defeating Cyclops, Rogue and Storm, Xavier meets his challenge and they do battle. Though Magneto gains the upper hand, Xavier tortures him with repressed memories of his childhood during The Holocaust, causing Magneto to flee in agony. In the first-season finale, he kidnaps Senator Kelly in order to once again attempt to begin a war, but is thwarted by a group of Sentinels. After Mastermold and the other Sentinels rebel against their creators and become a threat to the entire world, Magneto allies himself with the X-Men and they successfully eliminate the Sentinels, during which he saves Xavier's life.

He appears in nearly every episode in the second season, in which he and Professor Xavier have been depowered and travel throughout the Savage Land. At the end of that season, all of the X-Men save them from Mr. Sinister, and they regain their powers.

In season four, he creates Asteroid M as a safe haven for mutants who feel persecuted on Earth. Though his intentions are noble, a betrayal by his closest servant Fabian Cortez puts into motion a series of events after which he realizes that the world will never again trust him as the leader of the Asteroid, and he allows the base to be destroyed. In the fourth-season finale, Magneto teams up with Apocalypse, believing that the immortal will use his powers to resurrect his wife. When he discovers that Apocalypse plans to destroy all reality, Magneto helps the X-Men to defeat him.

Disheartened by the loss of his sanctuary, he does not care about even the impending assimilation of mankind by the Phalanx, until he receives news from the Beast, Forge, Mr. Sinister and Amelia Voght that his son, Quicksilver, has been kidnapped by the Phalanx in the second part of the two-part fifth-season premiere. He teams up with them to defeat the Phalanx and save everyone they had captured or assimilated.

His final appearance is in the last episode of the series  "Graduation Day", he has gathered up an entire army of rebellious mutants, and is poised to conquer the world, but receives news from Wolverine, Cyclops and Jean Grey that Professor Xavier is dying. Relenting, Magneto uses his power in conjunction with Xavier's in order to contact Lilandra Neramani, who takes Xavier to her planet where there is a suggestion that he may be cured. He is last seen along with the X-Men standing outside the mansion as Professor X departs.

As with many television shows, X-Men: The Animated Series has suffered from continuity errors. For one, in the episode where Magneto makes his initial appearance, aptly titled "Enter Magneto", the X-Men do not know him, as he is an old acquaintance of Xavier's. However, as the series progresses Magneto is shown fighting Iceman during a flashback in "Cold Comfort". It may be possible that only Iceman knows him since he was not present in "Enter Magneto" and was the only one fighting Magneto in the flashback.

2000s

X-Men: Evolution
Magneto's voice was provided by Christopher Judge in the animated television series X-Men: Evolution.

During the show's first season he is a shadowy, mysterious manipulator where the X-Men, except for Professor Xavier, do not know of his existence, until the first X-Man, Wolverine, figures it out, although Magneto becomes a more direct threat from the first-season finale. In the first season he uses his agent Mystique to assemble a team of mutants, and even recruits his own son Quicksilver to spy on them. In the first-season finale, he pits the Brotherhood against the X-Men and brings the winners to Asteroid M in an attempt to convince them to join his cause and to use a genetic enhancer to fully develop their powers as he had. His decision to leave Mystique behind leads her to betray him (although flashbacks indicate that they have been at odds since Magneto separated Mystique from her newborn son Nightcrawler), and their vendetta lasts throughout the second season.

In the second season, Magneto personally recruits a new team, the Acolytes, de-ages himself using the same technology that created Captain America as his genetic enhancements are no longer working, and finally reveals the existence of mutants to the public after the X-Men and the Brotherhood of Mutants fight off a Sentinel which was meant to destroy every known mutant. In this time, his daughter, Wanda is introduced, who hates Magneto for abandoning her as a child and leaving her in a mental asylum (when asked about what specific event led to Magneto institutionalizing Wanda) X-Men: Evolution'''s head writer Greg Johnson stated that "There was no specific event. It was just years of him trying to handle a hostile, out of control child whose powers were promising to be very destructive if he didn't get her put away".). She hunts him down relentlessly until he uses the mutant Mastermind to change her memories, painting him in a new light.

In the third and fourth seasons of the show, Magneto dedicates himself to preventing the awakening of the mutant Apocalypse, although all his attempts fail and upon Apocalypse's awakening he is transformed into one of his Four Horsemen after he is thought to have been killed by Apocalypse. He is freed of this enslavement in the finale episode "Ascension: Part Two" and is last seen being helped by his two children. In the final moments of the episode, Charles Xavier reveals that he witnessed the future in the mind of Apocalypse, and among the visions he saw was Magneto becoming an ally of the X-Men and training the New Mutants, like he did in the comics.

In this series, Magneto uses a device aboard Asteroid M to advance his evolution, and propelling his abilities to further heights. Evidently, this advancement pushes him onto another plateau of existing as a mutant. A claim that he references when he goes to fight Apocalypse, declaring that it is a battle between "higher evolutionaries". This is enforced by Caliban's claim that Magneto is too far advanced for him to locate, but that any other mutant was still within his capabilities.

Wolverine and the X-Men
Magneto appears in Wolverine and the X-Men voiced by Tom Kane in a rendition of Ian McKellen's portrayal of Magneto in the X-Men films. He is shown to rule the island of Genosha, where it appears most mutants are moving to, in light of recent anti-mutant feelings. Despite the government's treatment of mutants, they seem content to allow Magneto to promote Genosha in the United States with assorted poster and commercials. It is later revealed that Magneto found Professor X unconscious on Genosha after the destruction of the X-Mansion and took to caring for him. When the X-Men arrive to "rescue him" Magneto turns over his care to them, stating that they are his family. When Nightcrawler arrived in Genosha, he had his daughter Scarlet Witch give him a tour. During that time, he sends Mystique to the X-Mansion to "check up" on Professor X. Magneto, Scarlet Witch, and the Acolytes attacked Nightcrawler when he discovered Magneto's underground cells. When Nightcrawler did a lot of teleporting to warn the X-Men, Magneto had Mystique intercept him while he prepared a special cell for Nightcrawler. Magneto gave Quicksilver and his Brotherhood of Mutants a mission. During the transmission, Quicksilver tells his father that if they pull this off, he'd better receive a warm welcome back to Genosha. In "Battle Lines", Magneto had a talk with Senator Kelly about holding back the powerful mutants from being sent to Genosha. He later has his Acolytes raid the MRD prisons to free the mutants. In "Hunting Grounds", he finds out that Scarlet Witch and Nightcrawler had been abducted by Mojo. After the rescue, Scarlet Witch persuades Magneto to let Wolverine and Nightcrawler go. In "Backlash", Quicksilver was not pleased with Magneto when he cuts Quicksilver's Brotherhood of Mutants loose. After a chat with Quicksilver, he has Scarlet Witch notify the MRD of the Brotherhood's hideout. In "Aces and Eights", Senator Kelly sends Gambit to steal Magneto's helmet. When Gambit gets away without the helmet and Magneto learns of this, he was about to pummel Senator Kelly until intervention by the X-Men prevented this, showing Magneto and Kelly the true horror of the future their actions are creating.

While Kelly listens to reason and agrees to stop the Sentinel program, Magneto refuses to give up on his ambitions. In the three-part episode "Foresight", Magneto sends Mystique to pose as Senator Kelly to unleash the Sentinels on Genosha, making it appear as though Kelly started the attack. When the Sentinels attack Genosha, Magneto initially does nothing, claiming that the weak must be sacrificed so the strong can rally together. He then uses his powers to reprogram them to attack humans. He was knocked off his Sentinel by the Phoenix Force yet was rescued by Quicksilver who takes him back to Genosha. After the Phoenix Force was stopped, Scarlet Witch and Polaris had Blink teleport Magneto and Quicksilver away from Genosha. Finally seeing the corrupt and misguided nature of her father, Scarlet Witch takes control of Genosha with the islanders' full support. Though Scarlet Witch tells Quicksilver that he is always welcome in Genosha, she also states that Genosha is no longer Magneto's country; therefore banishing her own father.

The Super Hero Squad Show
Magneto appears in The Super Hero Squad Show voiced by Maurice LaMarche. Besides being depicted as an ally of Doctor Doom, this version is shown trying to train his children Quicksilver and Scarlet Witch to follow his legacy. In "Hexed, Vexed, and Perplexed", he arrived in Super Hero City with Quicksilver and Scarlet Witch in a plot to steal the Infinity Fractals from the Vault for Doctor Doom. He ends up fighting Captain America, Hawkeye, and the Super Hero Squad. When Falcon makes an attack on Magneto, Quicksilver uses his super speed to deflect the attack back at Falcon. Magneto sends his children to infiltrate the Helicarrier to steal the security codes in order to infiltrate the Vault. When the Super Hero Squad attacks, Magneto grabs an Infinity Fractal which gives him the ability to control matter which he uses to stop Falcon in mid-air. Scarlet Witch objects to Magneto hurting him more. Magneto releases them from his control only to take Falcon and Redwing captive as Quicksilver grabs the Infinity Fractals. Magneto then traps the Super Hero Squad in metal. Quicksilver discovers that Magneto had stolen the Infinity Fractals all along. Doctor Doom later attacks Magneto blaming him for stealing the Infinity Fractals until Falcon makes off with them. Doctor Doom holds Magneto responsible for his children helping Falcon and knocks him out. In "Lo, How the Mighty Hath Abdicated!", Magneto and Quicksilver attack the Helicarrier thinking that Scarlet Witch was kidnapped and brainwashed by the Super Hero Squad. Their fight ends up crashing the Helicarrier into Asgard. When Odin is freed from Enchantress' love lutefisk, he convinces Magneto to let Scarlet Witch stay with the Super Hero Squad. When Scarlet Witch states that she will come to Magneto when he needs her, Magneto states that if they meet as hero and villain, it will be different. Due to his transportation being wrecked, Magneto and Quicksilver ask the Super Hero Squad for a ride back to Super Hero City. A vastly older version appears in the alternate universe episode "Days, Nights, and Weekends of Futures Past", where he helps Falcon, HERBIE, and Reptil (known as "The Man") reform Scarlet Witch. Here, he is seen using a zimmer frame, complete with a bicycle horn, but later uses a scooter composed of Sentinel pieces.

2010s

Marvel Anime
Magneto was referenced in Marvel Anime: X-Men. In "Conflict", Cyclops mentions that Magneto is in a special plastic cell when discussing on how a metal bridge was twisted in a different direction. In a post-credits scene to "Destiny", it is revealed that Magneto's plastic prison has been destroyed and he has escaped.

Iron Man: Armored Adventures
Magneto appears in the Iron Man: Armored Adventures episode "The X-Factor" voiced by Ron Halder, also in a rendition of McKellen from the films. His alias includes Magnus, Max Eisenhart and Erik Lensherr and it is mentioned he was a victim of the Weapon X program (like the Ultimate version), and is considered to be as dangerous as Doctor Doom, as revealed when Pepper looks up his S.H.I.E.L.D. profile. Iron Man encounters Magneto in a parking lot having bounded anti-mutant activist Simon Trask with a metal pipe and ends up attacked by Magneto with the battle ending with Iron Man dropped into the trash cans. He was targeting Annie Clairmont (who was an alias for Jean Grey) and ends up catching up to her when she was at a diner with Tony Stark, James Rhodes, and Pepper Potts. Tony Stark becomes Iron Man while Magneto pursues Annie, Pepper, and James. When Iron Man arrives, Magneto uses his magnetic abilities on Iron Man and tries to constrict him. Annie tries to use her telekinesis to help Ironman but Magneto sends the metal objects  back at them. As Iron Man shuts down, Magneto uses his magnetic abilities to make off with Annie. At Magneto's hideaway, Magneto shows Annie the footage of Senator Robert Kelly's campaign against mutants and recaps his history of being experimented upon. When Annie tries to make mental contact with Iron Man, Magneto reveals to Annie that he had his hideout lined with the same mental-deflecting metal used for his helmet. Magneto plans to have Annie help him wage war against the humans one way or the other. When Iron Man and War Machine find Magneto's hideout, they get a mental message from Annie telling him where Magneto is. Using a special armor, Iron Man fights Magneto with War Machine's help. Both Iron Man and War Machine had a hard time fighting Magneto and his magnetic powers. Using his special force field, Iron Man blocks Magneto's magnetic attacks. Annie tells Iron Man that they have to remove his helmet in order for her mental attacks to harm him. Using his Uni-Beam attack, Iron Man knocks down Magneto as War Machine successfully removes his helmet. Annie takes the opportunity to use her mental powers to make Magneto fall asleep for a few days. Iron Man hopes that Magneto will awaken in a plastic cell.

Marvel Disk Wars: The Avengers
Magneto appears as a guest star in Episode 21 of Marvel Disk Wars: The Avengers, voiced by Banjō Ginga in Japanese and Neil Kaplan in English. In the show, he is stated to be an old enemy of the X-Men, but agrees to help rescue the kids and Noriko Ashida from the Sentinels after realizing he can recruit Noriko as a member of the Brotherhood of Mutants. He offers Noriko the chance to come with him and help create a world where mutants are the dominant species, but she rejects his offer, stating that Hikaru and the other children showed her that one day mutants and humans can live together in peace.

Films

Magneto appears in the X-Men film series, portrayed primarily by Sir Ian McKellen and Michael Fassbender. His character development in the films is directly influenced by the African American human rights leader Malcolm X. Brett Morris and Bill Milner portrayed the character as a child in the first film and First Class, respectively. This version's real name is Erik Magnus Lehnsherr.
 Magneto first appears in X-Men.
 Magneto appears in X2.
 Magneto appears in X-Men: The Last Stand.
 Magneto appears as a younger man in the prequel film X-Men: First Class.
 The older Magneto makes an uncredited cameo appearance in the mid-credits scene of The Wolverine.
 Both the younger and older incarnations of Magneto appear in X-Men: Days of Future Past.
 The younger Magneto appears in X-Men: Apocalypse.
 The younger Magneto appears in Dark Phoenix.

Video games

 Magneto is the final boss of the NES game Marvel's X-Men. However, players could only access his level via a special code input at the level selection screen.
 Magneto was one of the main villains in X-Men: Madness in Murderworld.
 Magneto is the final boss of the X-Men arcade game. He kidnaps Professor X and Kitty Pryde during the first two stages, prompting the heroes to go on a rescue mission.
 Magneto is the final boss of the Sega Genesis game, X-Men. However, after defeating Mojo, players must softly press the reset button on the console to delete a computer virus emitted on Mojo's level before time runs out, in order to face him.
 Magneto is the final boss of the SNES game X-Men: Mutant Apocalypse.
 Magneto appears in X-Men: Children of the Atom. He was the non-playable boss of the game whom the players must defeat at his space station Avalon. His abilities rendered him very difficult to defeat. He is voiced in the game by George Buza
 In X-Men 2: Clone Wars, Magneto served both as a boss and, for the first time in X-Men video game history, as a playable character. Upon defeating him in the third level aboard Asteroid M, Magneto joins the X-Men when he discovers that his entire crew had been assimilated by the alien Phalanx invasion.
 In Marvel Super Heroes, X-Men vs. Street Fighter and in Marvel vs. Capcom 2: New Age of Heroes he returns as a playable character, toned down from his appearance in Children of the Atom. He is also a selectable assist character in the first Marvel Vs. Capcom game. Lome Kennedy plays him in all these titles.
 In the Quake conversion X-Men: The Ravages of Apocalypse, the player played a cyborg created by and working for Magneto.
 Magneto appears X-Men: Next Dimension, voiced by Fred Tatasciore.
 Magneto appears as a boss in X2: Wolverine's Revenge, reprised by Fred Tatasciore. He is shown as a prisoner of The Void (a mutant prison) until he is released by Sabretooth. He is also shown in a Magnetic Flux Limiter Collar that was placed on him which ended up suppressing his magnetic powers long enough to make him more powerful. Wolverine ends up fighting him at an electrical plant.
 Magneto appears in X-Men Legends voiced by Tony Jay. Like the other characters in the game, he appears in his Ultimate costume, though his personality and his relationship with Xavier is more similar to his 616 incarnation. Mystique frees him from the U.S.S. Arbiter and he escapes to Asteroid M where he gives a televised transmission for any mutant who wants to get away from the Genetic Research and Security Organization (GRSO) to head to the Mount. When confronted by the X-Men, he fights them alongside Mystique and Sabretooth. After the defeat, Magneto and his Brotherhood get away.
 A capeless and non-helmeted version of Magneto was a playable character in the game Marvel Nemesis: Rise of the Imperfects, voiced Christopher Gaze. In story mode, he is the last playable Marvel character in the game's story mode and like many Marvel heroes and villains in the story, is taken down and (possibly) killed (a strange "swooshing" sound is heard as he faints/dies, indicating that he actually indeed dies). By the most powerful Imperfect, Paragon, after she refuses his offer of an alliance (She mistakes him for Niles Van Roekel, the man who kidnapped her, annihilated her village, froze her for several centuries and mutated her). In the PSP version of the game he still has his helmet.

 In X-Men Legends II: Rise of Apocalypse, Magneto (voiced by Richard Green) was made the main playable character as part of the game's Brotherhood. He and his Brotherhood of Mutants sided with the X-Men when Apocalypse kidnapped Quicksilver when rescuing Professor X and fighting the forces of Apocalypse. He has special dialogue with Zealot.
 Magneto also appeared in X-Men: The Official Game voiced by Dwight Schultz. Magneto is only playable in the DS version of the game. In this game (which is set between the X2 and X-Men: The Last Stand films), Magneto teams up with the X-Men to battle the Sentinels, and also sends Sabretooth in the Master Mold to retrieve Jason Stryker to make him a member of his Brotherhood. His plan was foiled by Wolverine.
 Originally, Magneto made a brief appearance in a cutscene in Marvel: Ultimate Alliance lying on the floor next to Professor X, both having been defeated by Doctor Doom. However, the new Xbox 360 downloadable content features him (with his classic costume, 1980s costume, Ultimate costume, and Xorn as alternate costumes) as a playable character with Richard Green reprising his role. Magneto has special dialogue with Professor X and Fin Fang Foom. He also has special dialogue with Arcade while triggering a disco ball in the Fun House of Murderworld, which was never used in the game. Additionally, there are unconfirmed rumors, which turns out to be a PC mod patch, created by a modder that if one uses Magneto in Mephisto's Realm after defeating Blackheart, he can save both Jean Grey and Nightcrawler, rather than letting one fall into the Void, in which other telekinetic users like Doctor Strange and Invisible Woman should have done this before.
 Magneto appears in the Wii, Nintendo DS, PlayStation 2, and PlayStation Portable versions of Marvel: Ultimate Alliance 2, voiced by Phil Proctor. He and Quicksilver have become victims of The Fold and will fight the heroes within a Repeater Tower in Reykjavík, Iceland. After he and Quicksilver are defeated and cured, Magneto uses his magnetism to help the heroes get to the top of the Repeater Tower. He appears in the Vicarious Visions (Xbox 360 and PlayStation 3, later also PlayStation 4, Xbox One and PC) versions of the game, and originally as downloadable content for the Xbox 360 and PlayStation 3 versions, with Fred Tatasciore reprising. There is also an extra mission where the player fights Magneto, which originally as DLC as well.
 Magneto appears in the Marvel Super Hero Squad video game voiced by Tom Kane. The players fight him on Asteroid M.
 Tom Kane also plays Magneto in Marvel vs. Capcom 3: Fate of Two Worlds and in Ultimate Marvel vs. Capcom 3. Magneto is the only character in the game not to have a DLC alternate costume. It was originally intended to be his House of M design, but it was removed following its controversial comparisons to former Spain ruler Juan Carlos I.
 Magneto appears in the Marvel Super Hero Squad: The Infinity Gauntlet video game voiced by Maurice LaMarche. Scarlet Witch and Quicksilver appear on Asteroid M in order to confront Magneto who mentions that the message they received is for them to contain the Space Infinity Stone which had been shattered following an attack by Doombots. When Scarlet Witch and Quicksilver reassemble it, Doctor Doom arrives and reveals that his attack on Magneto was just a ploy so that he could get the Space Infinity Gem. When Doctor Doom ends up defeated, he tricks Quicksilver and Scarlet Witch into swiping the Space Infinity Gem. Doctor Doom's attacks on Quicksilver and Scarlet Witch cause Magneto to use his magnetic abilities on Doctor Doom who reveals that he had placed Asteroid M on self-destruct. Magneto sends Doctor Doom flying where the Space Infinity Gem transports Doctor Doom to a cage. Magneto then gives his children the Space Infinity Gem. After Scarlet Witch and Quicksilver leave, Magneto claps off the self-destruct sequence. In the DS Version, he is a playable character on the last level of Challenge Mode.
 Magneto appears as both a playable character and a boss in Marvel Super Hero Squad Online.
 Magneto is available as downloadable content for the game LittleBigPlanet, as part of "Marvel Costume Kit 4".
 Magneto appears as a non-playable character in X-Men: Destiny voiced by Bill Graves.
 Magneto is featured as an unlockable character and a boss in the Facebook game Marvel: Avengers Alliance.
 Magneto appears as a playable character in the 2012 fighting game Marvel Avengers: Battle for Earth voiced by James Arnold Taylor.
 Magneto appears as a playable character in Lego Marvel Super Heroes, voiced by Nolan North. Magneto leads the Brotherhood of Mutants and the generic Acolytes in raiding the X-Mansion to steal the Tesseract. He is successful in his mission as he and Mystique escape with the Tesseract. Magneto uses the Statue of Liberty to attack Hulk, Mister Fantastic, and Wolverine. After Mastermind is defeated, Magneto tosses the head into the city and flees to the island where Asteroid M is. Mystique poses as Magneto while the real one heads into space on Asteroid M. When on Asteroid M, Iron Man, Spider-Man, and Thor defeat Magneto. Magneto is among the villains that help to fight Galactus. Afterward, the villains are given time to escape before they are pursued. In a bonus mission at the Raft, Magneto and Mystique infiltrate the Raft when Magneto suspects that Mysterio has his chess set that Magneto had left behind during his escape and confrontation with the heroes. Mysterio is reluctant to give Magneto his chess set back, causing Magneto and Mystique to fight past the inmates to get to Mysterio. Magneto and Mystique defeat Mysterio as Magneto reclaims his chess set.
 Magneto also appears as both a boss and a playable character in Marvel Heroes with James Arnold Taylor reprising his role.
 Magneto is a playable character in the 2014 fighting game Marvel: Contest of Champions.
 Magneto is a playable character in Marvel: Future Fight.
 Magneto appears as a playable character in Marvel Ultimate Alliance 3: The Black Order, with Tom Kane reprising his role. In the X-Men trailer, he appears alongside Mystique  and Juggernaut, attacking the X-Mansion and wielding the Power Stone. However, upon the arrival of the Black Order, Magneto concludes that an alliance is necessary and unites with the heroes.
 Magneto appears in Marvel Future Revolution'', with Tom Kane reprising his role.

References

External links
comingsoon.net